Several vessels have been named Atalanta  after the athlete Atalanta in ancient Greek mythology.

 was launched in Holland, perhaps under another name. She was captured in 1798, and thereafter traded generally. Between 1801 and 1804 she made two voyages as a slave ship in the triangular trade in enslaved people, and may have been temporarily captured during the second. Between 1808 and 1814 she made two voyages as a whaler in Australian and New Zealand waters. She was last listed in 1833.
 was built in Bermuda in 1799. She sailed to London and then between 1800 and 1802 she made two complete voyages as a slave ship. New owners sailed her as a West Indiaman. She suffered a minor maritime incident in 1803. A French privateer captured her in 1804.
 was launched at Newcastle-upon-Tyne in 1811. She initially sailed as a government transport, sailing to the Indian Ocean. She also captured an American vessel after the outbreak of war with the United States. She then became a West Indiaman, and later traded with Sierra Leone and Madeira. She made one voyage to Bombay, sailing under a licence from the British East India Company (EIC). She was broken up circa 1831.

 was a passenger vessel built for the London and South Western Railway in 1907.

See also
 or HMS Atalante, one of eight vessels of the British Royal Navy.
, one of eight vessels of the French Navy

Ship names